The International Film Music Critics Association Award for Best Original Score for a Drama Film is an annual award given by the International Film Music Critics Association, or the IFMCA. The award is given to the composer of a film score for a fantasy, science fiction and/or horror film deemed to be the best in a given year. The award was first given in 1998, but the genres were split, with fantasy films, science fiction films and horror films being grouped into their own categories. In 2005, fantasy and science fiction films were grouped together, while horror films were grouped with thriller films. It was first awarded, in its current form, in 2007, but reverted to dual categories the following year. It has been awarded, consecutively, since 2010.

Winners and nominations

1990s

2000s

2010s

2020s

References

International Film Music Critics Association Awards